A pontifical academy is an academic honorary society established by or under the direction of the Holy See. Some were in existence well before they were accepted as "Pontifical."

List
There are ten Pontifical academies headquartered at the Vatican in Rome. 

 The Pontifical Academy of Fine Arts and Letters of the Virtuosi al Pantheon, in Italian: , was established in 1542. Its purpose is to study, cultivate, and perfect the fine arts
 The Pontifical Academy of Martyrs or  dates from 1879 and promotes the veneration of the martyrs and the study of the catacombs

Pontifical Ecclesiastical Academy
The Pontifical Ecclesiastical Academy, an institution for the training of Catholic clergy to serve as apostolic nuncios, pro-nuncios or papal delegates, is not one of the pontifical academies, but is one of the Roman Colleges.

See also
 Global organisation of the Catholic Church
 Index of Vatican City-related articles

References

External links 

 Pontifical Academies - Website of the Holy See
 The website of the Pontifical Academy of Sciences